Jorge Urrutia Blondel (September 17, 1905 – July 5, 1981), was a Chilean composer, educator and writer, born in 1905. He has composed ballet music, symphonic poems, and works for piano and for voice. He is regarded as a Chilean nationalist in his music, but nevertheless the influence of Claude Debussy and Maurice Ravel can be detected in his orchestration and harmony. He co-authored, with S. Claro, Historia de la musica en Chile (History of Music in Chile), published in 1971.

Works
"Tres canciones campesinas de Chile"

References

Grijalbo - Diccionario Enciclopedico - 
Nueva Enciclopedia Cumbre - 
Diccionario Enciclopedico Grijalbo. 

1905 births
1981 deaths
Urrutia, Jorge
Chilean people of Basque descent
Urrutia, Jorge
Urrutia, Jorge
Urrutia, Jorge
People from La Serena
20th-century composers
20th-century male musicians